Samantabhadra (lit. "Universal Worthy", "All Good") is a great bodhisattva in Buddhism associated with practice and meditation. Together with Shakyamuni Buddha and the bodhisattva Mañjuśrī, he forms the Shakyamuni Triad in Mahayana Buddhism. He is the patron of the Lotus Sutra and, according to the Avatamsaka Sutra, made the ten great vows which are the basis of a bodhisattva. In Chinese Buddhism, Samantabhadra is known as Pǔxián and is associated with action, whereas Mañjuśrī is associated with prajñā (transcendent wisdom). In Japan, this bodhisattva is known as Fugen, and is often venerated in Tendai and Shingon Buddhism.

In the Nyingma school of Tibetan Buddhism, Samantabhadra is also the name of the Adi-Buddha, often portrayed in indivisible union (yab-yum) with his consort, Samantabhadrī. In wrathful form he is one of the Eight Herukas of the Nyingma Mahayoga and he is known as Vajramrtra, But this Samantabhadra buddha and Samantabhadra bodhisattva is not similar.

Origins
In the Lotus Sūtra, Samantabhadra is described at length in the epilogue, called the Samantabhadra Meditation Sutra, with special detail given to visualization of the bodhisattva, and the virtues of devotion to him.

Samantabhadra is also a key figure in the Āvataṃsaka-sūtra, particularly the last chapter, the Gaṇḍavyūha-sūtra.  In the climax of the Gaṇḍavyūha-sūtra, the student Sudhana meets Samantabhadra Bodhisattva, who teaches him that wisdom only exists for the sake of putting it into practice; that it is only good insofar as it benefits all living beings.

In the Āvataṃsaka-sūtra, the Buddha states that Samantabhadra Bodhisattva made ten great vows in his path to full Buddhahood:

 To pay homage and respect to all Buddhas.
 To praise the Thus Come One-Tathagata.
 To make abundant offerings. (e.g. give generously)
 To repent misdeeds and evil karmas.
 To rejoice in others' merits and virtues.
 To request the Buddhas to continue teaching.
 To request the Buddhas to remain in the world.
 To follow the teachings of the Buddhas at all times (Past, Present, Future).
 To accommodate and benefit all living beings.
 To transfer all merits and virtues to benefit all beings.

The ten vows have become a common practice in East Asian Buddhism, particularly the tenth vow, with many Buddhists traditionally dedicating their merit and good works to all beings during Buddhist liturgies.

In Mahayana Buddhism

Unlike his more popular counterpart Mañjuśrī, Samantabhadra is only rarely depicted alone and is usually found in a trinity on the right side of Shakyamuni, mounted on a white elephant. In those traditions that accept the Avatamsaka Sutra as its root instruction, Samantabhadra and Manjusri flank Vairocana Buddha, the central Buddha of this particular sutra.

Known as Pǔxián in Chinese, he is sometimes shown in Chinese art with feminine characteristics, riding an elephant with six tusks while carrying a lotus leaf 'parasol' (Sanskrit: chatra), bearing similar dress and features to some feminine depictions of Guanyin. It is in this guise that Samantabhadra is revered as the patron bodhisattva of the monasteries associated with Mount Emei in western China. Some believe that the white elephant mount of Samantabhadra was the same elephant that appeared to Queen Maya, the mother of the Buddha, to herald his birth.

Mahayana esoteric traditions treat Samantabhadra as one of the 'Primordial' (Sanskrit: Dharmakaya) Buddhas, but the main primordial Buddha is considered to be Vairocana.

Tibetan Buddhism 

In Tibetan Buddhism, Samantabhadra (Tibetan: Kuntuzangpo) is a name that refers to two different beings: 

 Bodhisattva Samantabhadra, one of the eight main bodhisattva attendants of Shakyamuni Buddha.
 The Primordial Buddha (Adi-Buddha) Samantabhadra (known as Vajradhara in the Sarma traditions). Samantabhadra appears in the Kunjed Gyalpo Tantra, as the Primordial Buddha, the 'embodiment' (Sanskrit: kaya) or 'field' (Sanskrit: kṣetra) of 'timeless awareness, gnosis' (Sanskrit: jñāna) awakened since before the very beginning.

Dzongsar Khyentse Rinpoche following the Nyingmapa Dzogchen tradition qualifies the nature and essence of Samantabhadra as follows:

Samantabhadra is not subject to limits of time, place, or physical conditions. Samantabhadra is not a colored being with two eyes, etc. Samantabhadra is the unity of awareness and emptiness, the unity of appearances and emptiness, the nature of mind, natural clarity with unceasing compassion - that is Samantabhadra from the very beginning.

'The Mirror of the Mind of Samantabhadra' is one of the Seventeen Tantras of Dzogchen Upadesha.

Bodhisattvas Mahasattva Samantabhadra Stanzas 
Extracted from booklet [The Vows of Bodhisattvas Samantabhadra sutra]. Translated by UPASIKA CHIHMANN

 Before the Lions among Men, Throughout the worlds of the ten directions. In the past, in the present, and also in the future, With body, speech, and mind entirely pure, I bow before them all, omitting none.
 With the awesome spiritual power of Samantabhadra's vows, I appear at the same. time before every Tathagatas, And in transformed bodies as numerous as motes of dust in all lands, Bow to the buddhas as numerous as motes of dust in all lands.
 In every mote of dust are Buddhas as numerous as mote of dust, Each dwelling amid a host of Bodhisattvas. Throughout the motes of dust in endless Dharmadhatu it is the same: I deeply believe they all are filled with omniscient buddhas.
 With oceans of sound i everywhere let fall. Words and phrases, wonderful and endless, Which now and through all the aeons of the future, Praise the wide, deep sea of Buddhas' merits and virtues.
 Immeasurable Flower garlands, supreme and wonderful, Music, perfumes, parasols and canopies, And other decorations rich and rare, I offer up to every Tathagatas.
 Fine clothing, superior incense, Powdered and burning incenses, lamps and candles, Each one heaped as high as Mount Sumeru, I offer completely to all the Omnipotent Tathagatas.
 With a vast, great, supremely, liberated mind, I believe in all the Buddhas of the three periods of time; With the strength of Samantabhadra's conduct and vows, I make offerings to all the Tathagatas everywhere.
 For all the evil deeds I have done in the past, Created by my body, speech and mind, From beginningless greed, anger, and delusion, I now know shame and repent them all.
 I rejoice in the merits and virtues. Of all beings in the ten directions,  From the most humble to the Arhats, Pratyeka-Buddhas, Bodhisattvas, and all the Tathagatas.
 Before the pioneers of Bodhi and the brilliant ones who are the Lamps of the world of the ten directions, Who have just accomplished Supreme Bodhi, I now request and beseech them all. To turn the foremost, wondrous Dharma wheel.
 If there are Buddhas who wish for Nirvana, I request with deep sincerity that they dwell in the world for a long time to bring benefits and bliss to every being.
 I worship those with blessings, praise them and make offerings; I request that the Buddhas remain in the world and turn the Dharmachakra; The good roots gained from following and rejoicing. In the merit and virtue and from repentance and reform, I transfer to living being and the Buddha Way.
 I follow the ways of the Buddhas and practice the perfect conduct of Samantabhadra; I make offerings to all the Tathagatas of the past, And to all present Buddhas throughout the ten directions.
 All future Teachers of Gods and Brahmas and Men whose aspirations and vows have been completed, I will follow in cary out the teaching throughout the three period of time and quickly attain Great Bodhi.
 In all lands of the ten directions, Vast, Great, pure and wonderfully adorned, All the Tathagatas sit beneath regal Bodhi Trees, While assemblies circumambulate them.
 I vow that every being in all directions will be peaceful, happy, and without worry, May they obtain the proper Dharma's profound aid, and may all their sufferings be wiped away, without exception.
 While striving to attain Bodhi, I will gain the knowledge of past lives in all destinies. I will join the order and cultivate pure precepts. Without outflows, never broken and without stain.
 Be they Brahmas, devas, nagas, yakshas, kumbhandas, Humans, non-humans and the rest, In the many languages of all such living beings. With every sound i will speak the Dharma.
 I will cultivate the pure paramitas with vigor, And never abandon the Bodhi Mind. I will banish all obstructions and defilements, And fulfil all wondrous practices.
 From all delusions, karma, and demon-states, Amid all worldly paths, I will be freed, just like the lotus does not touch the water, As the sun and moon do not stop in space.
 Ending the sufferings of the paths of evil, And to everyone equally bringing joy, May I for kalpas like the motes of dust in all lands every benefit all in the ten directions.
 Always in accord with living beings, Cultivating through all future aeons. The vast conduct of bodhisattva Samantabhadra, The unsurpassed Great Bodhi i will perfect it.
 May all who cultivate the vows of Samantabhadra always in my company with me, Our karmas of body, speech and mind the same, as we cultivate and study all practices and vows.
 With all advisors good and wise who aid me by explaining Samantabhadra's deeds. I vow always to congregate together; May they never be displeased with me.
 I desire always to meet the Tathagatas often and the hosts of disciples who gather around them. I will raise offerings, which are vast and great, Untiring to the end of future aeons.
 I will hold high the subtly wondrous Buddhadharma and illuminate all the practices of Bodhi; I will ultimately perfect in bodhisattva Samantabhadra's way, practicing until the end of time.
 Inexhaustible blessings and wisdom. I cultivate throughout all worlds; By concentration, wisdom, skilful means, and liberation, I will gain an endless store of merits and virtues.
 In one mote of dust are lands as numerous as motes of dust; In each land are incalculable numbers of Buddhas. In every place where the Buddhas dwell I see the host assembled, Endlessly proclaiming all the practices of Bodhi.
 In ten directions everywhere, throughout the sea of lands, Every hair-tip encompasses oceans of past, present and. future. So too, there is a sea of Buddhas, a sea of Buddha lands; Pervading them all I cultivate for seas of endless time.
 The speech of all Tathagatas is pure; Each word contains an ocean of sounds. According with what beings like to hear, The buddhas' sea of eloquence flows forth.
 All the Tathagattas of the three period of time forever turn the wonderful Dharma wheel. With these inexhaustible seas of words and languages. I understand all with my deep wisdom.
 I can penetrate the future and exhaust all aeons in a single thought. In a single thought I completely enter all aeons of the three periods of time.
 In one thought I can see all Lions of Men of the past, present and future; I constantly fathom the Buddhas' states. Their magical liberations and their awesome strength.
 On the tip of an extremely fine hair, appear jewelled lands of past, present and future; Lands on hair-tips as numerous as dust-motes. In all lands of the ten directions, I deeply enter, adorn and purify.
 All those who shall be the Lamps of the Future that light the world, Complete the way to turn the Dharma wheel, and rescue living beings. As they perfect the Buddhas' work and manifest Nirvana, I draw near and attend to each one rejoicing and learning.
 The spiritual power to go everywhere swiftly; The power to enter the Mahayana universally through the Universal Door; The power of wisdom and conduct to cultivate merits and Virtues universally the subtle spiritual power to shield all with Great Compassion.
 the power to purify and adorn all. With Supreme blessing everywhere; The power of wisdom which is unattached an independent; The awesome spiritual powers and the powers of concentration, Wisdom, and skill-in-means; the power of universally accumulating Bodhi.
 The power of good karma which purifies all things; The power to eradicate all afflictions; The power to subdue all demons; The power of fulfillment to perfect Samantabhadra's conduct
 the sea of lands I everywhere adorn and purify, And I liberate all living beings, without exception. With skill I make may i be able to discern the ocean of various Dharmas. May I be able to enter deeply into the ocean of wisdom.
 I cultivate the ocean of practices to purify, Perfected and completed a sea of vows. I draw near to a sea of Buddhas and make offerings, and cultivate without fatigue for an ocean of kalpas.
 To all the Tathagatas of the three periods of time, With Bodhi, Conduct, and vows most supreme, I completely offer up my perfect cultivation; With Samantabhadra's practices, I awaken to Bodhi.
 Each Tathagata has an elder disciple whose name is Samantabhadra, Honoured One. I now transfer all good roots towards the attainment of wisdom and behavior, and i vow to perform deeds of wisdom identical to His.
 I vow that my body, mouth and mind will be forever pure and that all practices and lands will also be. I vow in every way to be identical to the wisdom of Samantabhadra.
 I will wholly purify Samantabhadra's conduct, and the great vows of Manjusri as well. All their deeds I will fulfill, leaving nothing undone. Till the end of the future I will continue without weariness.
 Infinite and measureless is my cultivation; Boundless merit and virture I obtain. Amid Limitless practices I will dwell in peace, and penetrate the strength of spiritual powers.
 Manjusri has wisdom, courage and bravery; Samantabhadra's conduct and wisdom are the same. I now transfer all good roots, In order to follow them in practice and in study.
 In the three periods of time, all Buddhas praise such vows as these, lofty and great. I now transfer all good roots wishing to perfect the supreme practices of Samantabhadra.
 I vow that when my life approaches its end, all obstruction will be swept away; I will see Amitabha Buddha and be born in his Eternal Pureland of Sukhavati.
 When reborn in the western pureland (Land of Ultimate Bliss and Peace), I will perfect and completely fulfill, without exceptiooon these Greats Vowss, to delight and benefit all beings.
 The assembly of Amitabha buddha (Buddha of Limitless Light) is completely pure; when from a matchless lotus I am born, I will behold the Tathagata's Measureless Light as he appears before me to bestow a prediction of buddhahood.
 Receiving a prediction from the Tathagata, I will take countless appearances and forms, and with wisdom power vast and great, pervade ten directions to benefit all the realms of living beings.
 Realms of worlds in empty space might reach an end, and living beings, karma and afflictions be extinguished; But they will never be exhausted, and neither will my vows.
 With myriad jewels in boundless lands in all directions, I will make decorations and offerings to the Tathagatas. For aeons as numerous as the motes of dust in all lands, I bring the foremost peaces and joy to gods and humans.
 Yet, if anyone believes in these Great Vows, as they pass by the ear but a single time, and in search of Bodhi thirstily craves these vows, The merits and virtues gained will surpass these offering.
 With bad influences advisors forever left behind, From paths of evil he departs for eternity, Soon to see the Buddha of Limitless Light and perfect Samantabhadra's supreme vows
 Easily obtaining the blessing of long life, Assured of a noble rebirth in the human realm, Before long he will perfect and complete the practices of Samantabhadra.
 In the past, owing to a lack of wisdom power, The five offences of extreme evil he has committed; In one thought they can all be wiped away by reciting the Great Vows of Samantabhadra.
 (If he wishes to be born in the human orr deva worlds) His clan, race and color, marks and characteristics with his wisdom are all perfected and complete; Demons and externalism will have no ways to harm him, And he will be a field of merits in the Three Realms.
 To the regal Bodhi tree he will quickly go, And seated there subdue hordes of demons. Supremely and perfectly enlightened, he will turn the Dharma wheel, to benefit the host of living beings. 
 If anyone can read, recite, receive, and hold high Samantabhadra's Vows and proclaim them, His reward thereof none is able to estimate, except the Buddhas will know and he will obtain Bodhi's highest path.
 If anyone recites Samantadhadra's Vows, I will speak of a portion of his good roots: In one single thought he can fulfill the pure vows of sentient beings
 the supreme and endless blessing from Samantabhadra's conduct, I now universally transfer. May all living being, drowning and adrift, soon return to the land of Limitless Light.

Notes

References and further reading

External links
Samantabhadra Devotions
Samantabhadra: Internet Resources on the Bodhisattva Universal Worthy
Aspiration of Samantabhadra

Bodhisattvas